The Symphony No. 3 also known as the September Symphony is a symphony in four movements by Wojciech Kilar.

The impulse for writing the piece came from the September 11 attacks. The composer admitted in an interview with Tygodnik Powszechny that he loves America uncritically and incurably. The author's intention was to encourage the Americans. The work includes allusions to the song of Samuel Ward, America, the Beautiful from 1895. The work was completed in 2003. The world premiere took place in Warsaw on September 2, 2003. The Warsaw Philharmonic Orchestra was conducted by Antoni Wit.

Titles of parts of a work:
 1. Largo
 2. Allegro
 3. Largo
 4. Moderato

References

External links
September Symphony on YouTube, performed by Warsaw National Philharmonic Orchestra

Compositions by Wojciech Kilar
2003 compositions